The Alexander D. McDougall House is a historic house in the Willamette Heights neighborhood of Northwest Portland, in Portland, Oregon.

It was designed by architect Ellis Lawrence with elements of Tudor Revival architecture and Arts & Crafts architecture, and it was built in 1911 by local builders Franchell & Parlin.

The house is significant as an "excellent intact example" of the early work of Lawrence.  Its notable features include the views afforded from its siting; on the outside its landscaping, rock walls, decorative half-timbering, brickwork, and verandah; and on the inside its floor plan which provides "comfort and efficiency" despite the large size of the house, its oak paneling, niches, built-in benches, and art glass window.

See also
 National Register of Historic Places listings in Northwest Portland, Oregon 
 Natt and Christena McDougall House, nearby at 3728 NW Thurman Street, another NRHP-listed example of Ellis Lawrence's work

References

1911 establishments in Oregon
Arts and Crafts architecture in Oregon
Houses completed in 1911
Houses on the National Register of Historic Places in Portland, Oregon
Tudor Revival architecture in Oregon